Raven is an American martial arts drama series that originally aired on CBS from June 19, 1992 to April 30, 1993.

Overview 
Jonathon Raven is a ninja-trained former Special Forces agent, retired in Hawaii to search for his long-lost son. Avoiding assassins sent to kill him by his former associates in the Black Dragon Clan, he uses his skills to help those in need. He is assisted by his former military buddy turned eccentric private investigator, Herman Jablonski.

Plot
When Jonathon Raven was twelve years old, his parents were killed by the Black Dragon. He trained with them for many years in the deadly martial arts with the hopes of mastering their lethal skill and then using it against them for vengeance. Although he succeeded in infiltrating them, the Black Dragon are many in number, and are now bent on destroying Raven's bloodline. His one true love, a beautiful Japanese woman named Aki, becomes pregnant with their son at the same time the Black Dragon clan is after Raven's life. Aki unfortunately dies shortly after giving birth to their son, but before she passes away, she realizes that her son's life is in danger. Jonathon learns of his wife's plan of hiding their son from imperilment, but sadly never gets to see him or attain the knowledge of his location. Later on, he joins the U.S. Special Forces and becomes one of their top assassins under a man named Nick Henderson. After many complications and regrets, Raven leaves the Special Forces and continues his search for his long-lost son. His search eventually leads him to Honolulu, Hawaii, where he believes his son may be. Raven is on a lifelong journey in search of his son, and is willing to risk his life along the way to find him and ensure the safety of his life, with the aid of his old military buddy – a private investigator named Herman "Ski" Jablonski.

Cast 
Jeffrey Meek as Jonathon Raven
Lee Majors as Herman "Ski" Jablonski
Andy Bumatai as The Big Kahuna

Episodes

Original Pilot
Raven: Return of the Black Dragons – 90 minutes (without commercials)

Season 1: 1992

Season 2: 1993

Home media
The complete series as originally broadcast on CBS (including the abbreviated 70 minute pilot) was released as a manufacture-on-demand DVD by Sony Pictures Home Entertainment on April 5, 2016.

Mill Creek Entertainment announced the re-releasing of the series on DVD.

References

External links
 
 

Ninja fiction
Television series by Sony Pictures Television
CBS original programming
Martial arts television series
English-language television shows
1990s American drama television series
1990s American mystery television series
1992 American television series debuts
1993 American television series endings
American action adventure television series
Television shows set in Hawaii
Television shows filmed in Hawaii
Television series created by Frank Lupo
Japan in non-Japanese culture